U.S. Marshals is a 1998 American action crime thriller film directed by Stuart Baird. The storyline was conceived from a screenplay written by Roy Huggins and John Pogue. The film is a spin-off/sequel to the 1993 film The Fugitive, which in turn was based on the television series of the same name, created by Huggins. The story does not involve the character of Dr. Richard Kimble, portrayed by Harrison Ford in the initial film, but instead the plot centers on United States Deputy Marshal Sam Gerard, once again played by Tommy Lee Jones. The plot follows Gerard and his team as they pursue another fugitive, Mark Sheridan, played by Wesley Snipes, who attempts to escape government officials following an international conspiracy scandal. The cast features Robert Downey Jr., Joe Pantoliano, Daniel Roebuck, Tom Wood, and LaTanya Richardson, several of whom portrayed Deputy Marshals in the previous film.

The film was a co-production between Warner Bros. Pictures and Kopelson Entertainment. The score was composed by Jerry Goldsmith.

U.S. Marshals premiered in theaters in the United States on March 6, 1998, grossing $57 million in its domestic run. The film took in an additional $45 million through international release for a worldwide total of $102 million. The film was generally met with mixed critical reviews. The film was released on home video on July 21, 1998.

Plot
Two Diplomatic Security Service (DSS) Special Agents are killed while trying to intercept a briefcase exchange taking place in a United Nations parking garage in New York City. The murders are caught on a security camera, but the criminal escapes with top secret information.

Months later, Supervisory Deputy U.S. Marshal Samuel Gerard and his team corner the Conroy Brothers and their families at their house and celebrate afterwards especially after seeing it on the news. In the meantime, tow truck driver Mark Warren is arrested for an illegal weapons possession charge following a vehicular collision in Chicago, after a brief hospitalization. Through a fingerprint check, the police determine that he is actually federal fugitive Mark Roberts, wanted for a homicide. That night, Roberts boards a prisoner transport aircraft back to New York via Memphis, sharing the flight with Gerard, who is escorting prisoners unrelated to Roberts' case. Roberts thwarts an assassination attempt by a prisoner with an improvised firearm, but the bullet blows a window that depressurizes the cabin, killing the prisoner and another marshal. The pilots attempt an emergency landing but the damaged plane crashes into the Ohio River in southern Illinois. With the plane sinking, Gerard assists in rescuing fellow marshals and officers while they retrieve the surviving prisoners, but discovers Roberts has escaped. Eight hours later, DSS Special Agent John Royce is assigned to join Gerard's team and other officers to hunt Roberts, much to Gerard's reluctance to his potential in assistance.

Roberts flees to New York City after escaping a near death encounter with law enforcement in which Gerard and his team cornered him in a swampland in Kentucky. Once in New York, he secures money, weapons and fake identification from a former fellow US Marine of Force Recon. Roberts begins conducting surveillance on a Chinese diplomat named Xiang Chen. In Chicago, Gerard and the Marshals pursue several leads, including Roberts' girlfriend Marie Bineaux as well as the airplane mechanic who hid the zip gun, whom the Marshals find murdered by Chen. Gerard and his colleagues manage to access surveillance footage of the murders in the parking garage and realize that Roberts acted in self-defense and was wearing gloves; thus he wouldn't have been identified by fingerprints at the scene as was earlier claimed. Confronted with the evidence, DSS Director Bertram Lamb admits to Gerard and his senior supervisor Katherine Walsh that Mark Roberts is in fact Mark Sheridan, a former CIA Special Activities Division Agent and a former Force Recon Marine, that seemingly went rogue during an investigation to uncover a spy within the U.S. State Department that had been selling classified intelligence to the Chinese government. Chen was the contact delivering the money to Sheridan for the information and when DSS Special Agents tried to apprehend him, Sheridan killed them in self-defense and fled the scene.

Eventually, Gerard and his team catch up with Sheridan in Queens Hill Cemetery where he meets with, and threatens to expose, DSS Special Agent Frank Barrows as one of the conspirators who framed him. Chen tries to assassinate Sheridan as he leaves the cemetery, but inadvertently kills Barrows instead. Sheridan escapes to a nearby retirement home followed by Gerard, Royce and Deputy Marshal Noah Newman. Meanwhile, Chen is apprehended and detained by Deputy Marshals Savannah Cooper and Bob Biggs. At the senior care facility, Newman overhears a physical struggle and walks into a room where he witnesses Royce holding Sheridan at gunpoint. Royce suddenly shoots Newman with his gun and later gives false information to Gerard, claiming Sheridan shot Newman. Sheridan escapes by swinging from the building onto the roof of a passing subway train. Newman dies of his gunshot wounds on route to the hospital.

After retrieving fingerprints from an abandoned vehicle at a marine loading dock, Gerard tracks down Sheridan on a freighter ship bound for Canada. During a battle between Sheridan and Gerard aboard the vessel, Royce shoots Sheridan, injuring him. Sheridan is later taken into custody. Gerard begins to suspect Royce may be the mole when he notices the firearm that shot Newman had its serial number filed off (in an attempt to hide it), was actually Royce's own gun earlier. Left alone to guard Sheridan's hospital room, Royce wakes Sheridan up to murder him, but Gerard steps in, confronts Royce, and then kills him in self-defense. After leaving the hospital, Sheridan's charges are dropped as he is exonerated and released. Gerard and his team depart to drink a toast to Newman.

Cast

 Tommy Lee Jones as Chief Deputy U.S. Marshal Sam Gerard
 Wesley Snipes as Mark J. Sheridan / Mark Roberts / Mark Warren
 Robert Downey Jr. as DSS Special Agent John Royce
 Joe Pantoliano as Deputy U.S. Marshal Cosmo Renfro
 Daniel Roebuck as Deputy U.S. Marshal Bobby Biggs
 Tom Wood as Deputy U.S. Marshal Noah Newman
 LaTanya Richardson as Deputy U.S. Marshal Savannah Cooper
 Irène Jacob as Marie Bineaux
 Kate Nelligan as U.S. Marshal Catherine Walsh
 Patrick Malahide as DSS Director Bertram Lamb
 Rick Snyder as DSS Special Agent Frank Barrows
 Michael Paul Chan as MSS Agent Xiang Chen
 James Sie as Vincent Ling
 Tracy Letts as Sheriff Poe
 Len Bajenski as Deputy Hollander
 Donald Gibb as Mike Conroy
 Tony Fitzpatrick as Greg Conroy
 Cynthia Baker as Mama Conroy
 Susan Hart as Greg's Girlfriend
 Johnny Lee Davenport as Deputy U.S. Marshal Henry
 Vaitiare Hirshon as Stacia Vela
 Lorenzo Clemons as Stark

Production

Filming
Filming locations included, Metropolis, Illinois; Bay City; Shawneetown; Chicago (all Illinois); New York; Benton, Kentucky; and at Reelfoot Lake, (Walnut Log) in Obion County, Tennessee.

Music

The original motion picture soundtrack for U.S. Marshals was released by the Varèse Sarabande music label on March 10, 1998. The score for the film was composed and conducted by Jerry Goldsmith and mixed by Bruce Botnick. Kenneth Hall edited the film's music.

Release

Home media
Following its cinematic release, the Region 1 Code widescreen edition of the film was released on DVD in the U.S. on July 21, 1998. Special features for the DVD include; interactive behind-the-scenes documentary – Anatomy of the Plane Crash; historical documentary – Justice Under the Star; feature-length commentary by director Stuart Baird; interactive menus; production notes; two theatrical trailers; three TV spots; and scene access. Additionally, a Special Edition repackaged DVD was also released on November 3, 2009. Special features include; a closed caption option; interactive behind-the-scenes documentary – Anatomy of the Plane Crash; historical documentary – Justice Under the Star; feature length commentary by director Stuart Baird; two theatrical trailers; and three TV spots.

In supplemental fashion, a VHS format version of the film was released on February 2, 1999. A restored widescreen hi-definition Blu-ray Disc version of the film was released on June 5, 2012. Special features include; two documentaries – Anatomy of the plane crash and Justice under the star; commentary by director Stuart Baird; and the theatrical trailer. An additional viewing option for the film in the media format of Video on demand has been made available as well.

Reception

Box office
U.S. Marshals premiered in cinemas on March 6, 1998, in wide release throughout the United States. During that weekend, the film opened in 2nd place, grossing $16,863,988 at 2,817 locations. The film Titanic was in first place during that weekend, with $17,605,849 in revenue. The film's revenue dropped by 32% in its second week of release, earning $11,355,259. For that particular weekend, the film fell to 3rd place with the same theater count. The continuing success of Titanic remained unchallenged in first place with $17,578,815 in box office business. During its final week in release, U.S. Marshals was in 60th place, grossing a marginal $16,828 in revenue. U.S. Marshals went on to top out domestically at $57,167,405 in total ticket sales through its theatrical run. For 1998 as a whole, the film would cumulatively rank at a box office performance position of 36.

Critical response
Among mainstream critics in the U.S., the film received mixed reviews. Rotten Tomatoes gave the film a score of 30% based on reviews from 43 critics, with an average score of 4.9 out of 10. The site's consensus states: "A rote albeit well-cast action thriller, U.S. Marshals suffers badly in comparison to the beloved blockbuster that preceded it." At Metacritic, which assigns a weighted average out of 100 to critics' reviews, U.S. Marshals was given a score of 47 based on 20 reviews. Audiences polled by CinemaScore gave the film an average grade of "A−" on an A+ to F scale.

Barbara Shulgasser, writing in The San Francisco Examiner, commented in positive sentiment about the acting, saying, "The film's pacing is unimpeachable and good performances are delivered by Jones, Snipes, Irene Jacob as Sheridan's loyal girlfriend and, for brief moments, Kate Nelligan as Gerard's tough but lovable boss." Left impressed, Desson Howe in The Washington Post noted how "Every story beat is expertly planned and executed." Howe also praised director Baird, exclaiming how he "runs the show with a smart eye and a metronome ticking somewhere in his mind." In a mixed to negative review, Russell Smith of The Austin Chronicle bluntly deduced that, "Unlike Kimble, whose innocence and decency are known from the beginning in The Fugitive, Sheridan is a total cipher to both Gerard and the audience until deep into this two-hours-plus film. Ergo, we can't be expected to give a rat's ass what happens to him – and don't." Owen Gleiberman of Entertainment Weekly opined that U.S. Marshals was "Lean, tense, and satisfyingly tricky."

The film however, was not without its detractors. Writing for the Chicago Sun-Times, Roger Ebert, giving the film two and a half stars out of four, observed, "I didn't expect U.S. Marshals to be the equal of The Fugitive, and it isn't. But I hoped it would approach the taut tension of the 1993 film, and it doesn't. It has extra scenes, needless characters, an aimless plot and a solution that the hero seems to keep learning and then forgetting." In a primarily negative review, Mick LaSalle, writing for the San Francisco Chronicle, called the film "a bad idea to begin with." He noted his confusion with the plot, remarking, "the movie tells us from the beginning that the fugitive is not quite innocent. He killed two fellow agents in self-defense. All this does is muddy the moral waters, making us queasy about the one guy we like. At no point is there ever a compelling reason to keep watching." Describing a mild negative opinion, James Berardinelli of ReelViews professed Marshal Gerard as exhibiting "only a token resemblance to the character who doggedly pursued Kimble in The Fugitive. As re-invented here, Gerard is a generic action hero; most of the quirks that made him interesting (and that earned Jones an Oscar) are absent. With a few minor re-writes, John McClane from the Die Hard movies could have been plugged into this role."

Dissatisfied with the film's quality, Jonathan Rosenbaum of the Chicago Reader said that it was "Not so much a sequel to The Fugitive as a lazy spin-off that imitates only what was boring and artificially frenetic about that earlier thriller; the little that kept it interesting—Tommy Lee Jones's Oscar-winning inflections, better-than-average direction—is nowhere in evidence." Stephen Hunter, writing for The Washington Post, reasoned, "It turns out to be one of those lame double-agent things where everybody's working for everybody else, the security of Taiwan (Taiwan!) is at stake, and it never quite lurches into clarity or acquires any real emotional punch. I didn't think the end of The Fugitive was so great either: Who wants to watch doctors fistfight on a roof? But by the time it winds down, U.S. Marshals has all but destroyed itself." Film critic Maitland McDonagh of TV Guide was not consumed with the nature of the subject matter, declaring, "To every hit there is a season, and a time for every sequel under heaven – no matter what narrative contortions it takes." She later surmised, "The minute Gerard mocks Royce's 'nickel-plated sissy pistol,' it's clear they're headed for a cathartic showdown, and anyone who can't see which member of Gerard's merry band might as well be wearing a 'Dead Meat Walking' T-shirt really shouldn't be allowed to operate complicated machinery."

Other media

Novelization
A novelization of the film, U.S. Marshals: A Novel, written by Max Allan Collins, was released on March 1, 1998.

See also

 The Fugitive (1963 TV series)
 1998 in film

References

Further reading

External links

 
 
 
 
 
 

1998 action thriller films
1990s chase films
1998 crime thriller films
1998 films
American action thriller films
American chase films
American crime thriller films
American disaster films
American police detective films
Film spin-offs
Films about aviation accidents or incidents
Films about miscarriage of justice
Films based on television series
Films directed by Stuart Baird
Films produced by Arnold Kopelson
Films scored by Jerry Goldsmith
Films set in Chicago
Films set in Kentucky
Films set in New York City
Films set on airplanes
Films shot in Chicago
Films shot in Kentucky
Films shot in New York City
Films shot in Tennessee
The Fugitive (TV series)
United States Marshals Service in fiction
Warner Bros. films
1990s English-language films
1990s American films